Henry Arnold Beitzel (27 May 1897 – 6 November 1982) was an Australian rules footballer who played for the St Kilda Football Club and Fitzroy Football Club in the Victorian Football League (VFL).

In July 1915, Beitzel enlisted to serve in World War I, having his right thumb amputated while fighting in North Africa and later fighting in France. He also served in World War II.

Arnold's son, Harry Beitzel was the umpire in charge of the 1955 VFL Grand Final.

Notes

External links 

1897 births
1982 deaths
Australian rules footballers from Victoria (Australia)
St Kilda Football Club players
Fitzroy Football Club players
Shepparton Football Club players
Australian military personnel of World War I
Australian Army personnel of World War II
Australian Army officers
People from Cardinia
Military personnel from Victoria (Australia)